Store Merløse is a town on Sjælland in Denmark with a population of 1,184 (1 January 2022). It is part of the municipality of Holbæk and close to Tølløse and Ringsted. It is a calm town with a primary school and a few businesses. For high school most people go to Tølløse. There is a local train from Vestsjællands Lokalbaner that will take you from Store Merløse to Tølløse or Slagelse.

Notable people 
 Emil Nielsen (born 1993 in Store Merløse) a Danish professional footballer for Lyngby Boldklub

References

Cities and towns in Region Zealand
Holbæk Municipality